Rob Halliday-Stein (born 4 August 1977) is a Birmingham, England entrepreneur who is the founder and managing director of Jewellery Quarter Bullion Limited. The company trades under the brands BullionByPost and gold.co.uk. Turnover has grown rapidly and now exceeds £100 million per annum.  Halliday-Stein owns 90% of BullionByPost.

Early life 

Halliday-Stein was born in Moseley, Birmingham, the middle of three sons. His mother trained teachers and his father was a research scientist with British Gas. His parents divorced when he was two and Halliday-Stein and his siblings stayed in the family home with their mother.

Halliday-Stein attended St John's primary in Sparkhill and then King Edward VI Five Ways grammar school in Bartley Green. There he discovered his love of economics, and after A-levels he studied the subject at Sheffield University.

Career
Halliday-Stein got his first job at Dollond & Aitchison, the optician, where he had worked during holidays. He was with the firm seven years, ending up in marketing. He was then a senior manager at Asda where he managed the development and successful launch of George online.  Before that, he spent 7 years building my retail and online experience at Dollond & Aitchison working across operations, marketing and HR.

In June 2014, Halliday-Steinwas named Midlands Director of the Year by the Institute of Directors.

In June 2017, Halliday-Stein was the Midlands winner of EY Entrepreneur Of The Year winning the 'disruptor' category.

Halliday-Stein owns two online jewelry stores, thefinejewellerycompany.com and thejewellers.com, a Virtual Reality production facility, Holosphere, and a company specialising in home security, Smartinstall.

Halliday-Stein also founded Inside Out Ventures, a business that works within prisons to create businesses that work to train offenders in prison with the hope of finding and giving them sustainable employment upon release.

References

1977 births
People from Birmingham, West Midlands
Living people